Sympagus is a genus of beetles in the family Cerambycidae, containing the following species:

 Sympagus bimaculatus (Gilmour, 1958)
 Sympagus buckleyi (Bates, 1885)
 Sympagus cedrelis Hovore & Toledo, 2006
 Sympagus favorabilis Tippmann, 1960
 Sympagus laetabilis (Bates, 1872)
 Sympagus monnei Hovore & Toledo, 2006

References

Acanthocinini